"Shut Down" is a song by South Korean girl group Blackpink that was released on September 16, 2022, through YG Entertainment and Interscope Records as the second single of the group's second studio album, Born Pink. Described as a hip hop-based track with strings, the song was written by Teddy, Danny Chung, and Vince and composed by Teddy and 24.

"Shut Down" was a commercial success and became Blackpink's second number-one hit on the Billboard Global 200. In South Korea, the track topped Billboards South Korea Songs chart for three weeks and peaked at number three on the Circle Digital Chart. It also topped the charts in Hong Kong, Indonesia, Malaysia, Philippines, Singapore, Taiwan, and Vietnam, and entered the top ten in Australia, Canada, New Zealand, India and South Korea. An accompanying music video for the song was uploaded onto Blackpink's YouTube channel simultaneously with the single's release.

Background
On July 31, 2022, a teaser video was uploaded on Blackpink's social media accounts, announcing the release of a new album in September, preceded by the pre-release single "Pink Venom" on August 19. On August 24, YG Entertainment announced that the four members of Blackpink were filming the music video for their second album's lead single in Gyeonggi Province in South Korea.
The label stated that the group was preparing for their world tour and teased their next single: "they are working hard on a schedule to fulfill their promises to their fans … all the songs on the album are the crystals that will write a new story for Blackpink, but the title song in particular will be a song that will surprise world music fans. The music video will also elevate the status of K-Pop with a difference that has never been seen before."

On September 6, 2022, the title poster for the second single, "Shut Down", was released on Blackpink's social media accounts. From September 10 to 13, promotional posters of each of the members were released. On September 13, a teaser for the music video was released, and the official music video was released on September 16.

Composition 
"Shut Down" is a hip hop-based track with strings and an insistent bass sound. It samples the beginning of the third movement of Italian composer Niccolò Paganini's second violin concerto, commonly known as "La Campanella". YG Entertainment described the song's title as "intuitive but strangely tense," noting that "'Shut Down' is a word that means the closure of a certain space." "Shut Down" was composed in the key of B-flat minor with a tempo of 110 beats per minute in a compound meter, running for two minutes and 57 seconds. Lyrically, the song sees the members clap back at their haters. Elles Erica Gonzales wrote that "throughout the track, the girls take turns telling their haters and doubters to take a seat".

Critical reception 
Billboard called "Shut Down" one of the best songs of 2022, praising its "swagger and savvy" and the melding of classical music and hip-hop as "ingenious."

Commercial performance  
"Shut Down" debuted at number one on the Billboard Global 200 with 152.8 million streams and 17,000 downloads sold, earning Blackpink their second number-one hit on the chart after "Pink Venom". The group joined BTS, Justin Bieber and Olivia Rodrigo as the only acts with multiple leaders on the chart. With "Pink Venom" at number two, Blackpink also became the first group to hold the top two spots in a single week on the Global 200. "Shut Down" debuted at number one on the Global Excl. U.S. with 140 million streams and 13,000 downloads sold outside the U.S., earning Blackpink their third number-one hit on the chart after "Lovesick Girls" and "Pink Venom". With this, Blackpink became the artist with the second-most number-one hits on the chart after BTS. The group also became the fourth act to debut atop the Global 200, Global Excl. U.S. and Billboard 200 charts simultaneously with "Shut Down" and its parent album Born Pink, joining BTS, Justin Bieber and Taylor Swift as the only acts to achieve this feat.

In South Korea, "Shut Down" debuted at number 29 on the week 38 issue of the Circle Digital Chart for the period dated September 11–17, with less than two days of tracking. It peaked at number three the following week, for the period dated September 18–24. In the United States, the song entered the Billboard Hot 100 at number 25 for the week of September 16–22. It earned 4,000 downloads and debuted at number ten on Streaming Songs with 13 million streams, becoming the group's third top-ten on the chart and second completely solo. With this, Blackpink became the first girl group to have multiple top tens and tied Psy for the second-most top tens by a Korean act, and also became the first Korean act to have a non-compilation album yield multiple top tens on the chart. "Shut Down" also debuted at number 24 on the UK Singles Chart, marking the group's eighth top-forty hit in the country.

Music video 
A teaser for the music video of "Shut Down" was released on September 13, 2022, and the official music video was released on September 16, 2022. It surpassed 100 million views in five days and three hours.

The video references previous music videos released by Blackpink. In the opening shot of the video, Lisa stands on a deck against a dark sky ("Playing with Fire") before taking the wheel for a group car ride, mirroring a scene from "Whistle" in which Rosé drove. The scene in "Ddu-Du Ddu-Du" of Jennie rapping while sitting on a military tank with pink shopping bags is also recreated. Lisa raps sitting among black bags full of pink cash and speakers ("Boombayah"). Jisoo protects herself from raining money with a pink umbrella ("Ddu-Du Ddu-Du"). Just as in "Whistle", Rosé sits on top of the Earth, except the globe in "Shut Down" is black and pink. In another scene, she drives a car alone ("Kill This Love"). In "Playing with Fire", Jennie plays with a match with orange flame in a white bathtub; in "Shut Down", she does the same in an onyx bathtub and with a pink flame. Lisa wields a sword with the word "Blackpink" written on it, and Rosé swings on a chandelier ("Ddu-Du Ddu-Du"). Jisoo trips and falls in front of paparazzi filming her every move in "Ddu-Du Ddu-Du" but confidently takes pictures of herself without the glaring eyes of the photographers in "Shut Down". During the chorus, the members dance in an alley lined with posters referencing the titles of their solo and group songs.

Dance performance video 
The dance performance video was additionally released on September 18, 2022; the video consists of the four members doing the full choreography in matching black outfits in front of a set decorated with silver shutters, indicating of the music video concept and added a sense of immersion. Later the girls was joined by a series of dancers in gray outfits, The dancers then joined the quartet for the finishing final poses.

The performance was choreographed by Kiel Tutin, Taryn Cheng, Lee Jeong (Ri Jeong), and Kyle Hanagami of the choreography team YGX. The choreographers noted: "We emphasized Blackpink's unique strong hip-hop swag. Also we maximized the core points of the performance and the colorful charms of the members."

Accolades

Live performances and promotion
On September 16, 2022, the group held a livestream on their official YouTube channel one hour before the release of Born Pink on a large stage themed after the concept of "Shut Down". In the broadcast, the members revealed behind-the-scenes stories of the music video filming, future activities and sneak peeks of the Born Pink World Tour, and they introduced the new songs on the album. On the same day, the group gave interviews on US radio stations Sirius XM and 102.7 KIIS FM. On September 19, 2022, they performed the song live for the first time on Jimmy Kimmel Live! on ABC, and on September 25, they appeared on SBS's Inkigayo to perform the song for the first time on a domestic music program. On January 28, 2023, Blackpink performed "Shut Down" with Swedish violinist Daniel Lozakovich at the Le Gala des Pièces Jaunes charity event organized by the First Lady of France, Brigitte Macron, in Paris.

Charts

Weekly charts

Monthly charts

Year-end charts

Release history

See also
 List of Billboard Global 200 number ones of 2022
 List of Inkigayo Chart winners (2022)
 List of K-pop songs on the Billboard charts
 List of M Countdown Chart winners (2022)
 List of number-one songs of 2022 (Malaysia)
 List of number-one songs of 2022 (Singapore)
 List of Show Champion Chart winners (2022)
 List of Show! Music Core Chart winners (2022)

Notes

References

2022 songs
2022 singles
Billboard Global 200 number-one singles
Billboard Global Excl. U.S. number-one singles
Number-one singles in the Philippines
Number-one singles in Singapore
Blackpink songs
Interscope Records singles
YG Entertainment singles
Songs written by Teddy Park